Jullian Taylor (born January 30, 1995) is an American football defensive end who played in the NFL for the San Francisco 49ers and is currently a free agent. He played college football at Temple. Taylor posted 41 tackles with 11 tackles for loss in 2017, his only season as a starter for the Owls.

Taylor played prep football at Williamstown High School in Monroe Township, Gloucester County, New Jersey.

Professional career

San Francisco 49ers
Taylor was drafted by the San Francisco 49ers in the seventh round (223rd overall) of the 2018 NFL Draft.
The selection used to select Taylor was traded from the Miami Dolphins in a trade for Daniel Kilgore. During his rookie year in 2018, Taylor played 6 games with 7 tackles.

On December 28, 2019, Taylor was placed on injured reserve after suffering an anterior cruciate ligament injury in practice. Without Taylor, the 49ers reached Super Bowl LIV, but they lost 31–20 to the Kansas City Chiefs. He was placed on the active/physically unable to perform list (PUP) at the start of training camp on July 28, 2020, and was placed on the reserve/PUP list at the start of the regular season on September 5, 2020. On November 3, 2020, Taylor was waived from the PUP list by the 49ers with a failed physical designation.

Tennessee Titans
On February 25, 2021, Taylor signed with the Tennessee Titans. He was waived on June 3, 2021.

Minnesota Vikings
On April 7, 2022, Taylor signed with the Minnesota Vikings. He was waived/injured on August 22, 2022 and placed on injured reserve. He was released on August 30.

References

External links
Temple Owls football bio

1995 births
Living people
American football defensive tackles
Minnesota Vikings players
People from Monroe Township, Gloucester County, New Jersey
Players of American football from New Jersey
Players of American football from Pennsylvania
San Francisco 49ers players
Sportspeople from Gloucester County, New Jersey
Sportspeople from Montgomery County, Pennsylvania
Temple Owls football players
Tennessee Titans players